Jozef A. M. K. IJsewijn (Zwijndrecht, 30 December 1932 – Leuven, 27 November 1998) was a Belgian Latinist. He studied classical philology at the Katholieke Universiteit Leuven, where he became a professor in 1967. An authority on Neo-Latin literature (Latin texts since the beginning of humanism in the 14th century), IJsewijn has been called "the founding father of modern neo-Latin studies". In 1980, he was awarded the Francqui Prize on Human Sciences. A collection of essays in his memory was published in 2000.

Works
 De sacerdotibus sacerdotiisque Alexandri Magni et Lagidarum eponymis, 1961
 (ed. with G. Verbeke) The late middle ages and the dawn of humanism outside Italy; proceedings of the international conference, Louvain, May 11-13, 1970, 1972
 Companion to neo-Latin studies, 1977
 (ed. with Jaques Paquet) The universities in the late Middle Ages, 1978
 (ed.)
 (tr. and ed. with Barbara Lawatsch-Boomgaarden) Voyage to Maryland (1633) = Relatio itineris in Marilandiam by Andrew White, 1995.

References

1932 births
1998 deaths
Belgian classical scholars
Flemish academics
Academic staff of KU Leuven
People from Antwerp Province
Dutch Latinists